The Denmark national under-19 football team is a team under the Danish Football Association, selected among all Danish football players under the age of 19, to represent Denmark in international U / 19 football tournaments organized by FIFA and UEFA. The team was founded in 1950 as an under-18 team. In 2001, it was changed to an under-19 team.

Players

Current squad
 The following players were called up for the friendly matches.
 Match dates: 18 and 21 November 2022
 Opposition: 
Caps and goals correct as of: 27 September 2022, after the match against .

Recent call-ups
The following players have also been called up to the squad within the last twelve months and remain eligible for selection.

Competitive record
The Danish under-19 squad has never taken part in the FIFA U-20 World Cup, and did not start attempting to qualify for the UEFA European Under-18/19 Football Championship until 1971 (for the 1972 edition).

Under-18 era

*Draws also include penalty shootouts, regardless of the outcome.

Under-19 era

*Draws also include penalty shootouts, regardless of the outcome.

Head coaches
 1970–1973:  Bent Dahl
 1973–1975:  Poul Erik Bech
 1975–1976:  Kai Arne Nielsen
 1976–1980:  Kaj Christensen
 1980–1981:  Hans Brun Larsen
 1982–1986:  Per Simonsen
 1986–1991:  Per Andersen
 1992:  Jan B. Poulsen
 1993:  Flemming Serritslev
 1994–2012:  Per Andersen
 2012–2013:  Thomas Frank
 2013–2016:  Bent Christensen Arensøe
 2016-2020:  Henrik Clausen
 2020-2021:  Jens Fønskov Olsen
 2021-2022:  Lars Knudsen
 2022-:  Claus Nørgaard

See also
 Denmark men's national football team
 Denmark men's national under-21 football team
 Denmark men's national under-17 football team
 Denmark women's national football team
 Denmark women's national under-19 football team
 Denmark women's national under-17 football team

References 

European national under-19 association football teams
under-19